Duane Hanson (January 17, 1925 – January 6, 1996) was an American artist and sculptor born in Minnesota. He spent most of his career in South Florida. He was known for his life-sized realistic sculptures of people. He cast the works based on human models in various materials, including polyester resin, fiberglass, Bondo, and bronze. Hanson's works are in the permanent collections of The Whitney Museum of American Art, The San Francisco Museum of Modern Art, and The Smithsonian.

Education
Duane Elwood Hanson was born January 17, 1925, in Alexandria, Minnesota. After attendance at Luther College and the University of Washington, he graduated from Macalester College in 1946. Following a period where he taught high school art, he received a Master of Fine Arts degree from the Cranbrook Academy of Art in Bloomfield Hills in 1951.

Career and style
Around 1966 Hanson began making figural casts using fiberglass and vinyl. Works that first brought him to notice were of figures grouped in tableaux, some depicting brutal and violent subjects. Hanson's Abortion (1966) was inspired by the horrors of an illicit backroom procedure, and Accident (1967) showed a motorcycle crash. Race Riot (1969–1971) included among its seven figures a white policeman terrorizing an African American man as well as an African American rioter attacking the policeman. Other works which dealt with physical violence or other explosive social issues of the 1960s were Riot (1967), Football Players (1969), and Vietnam Scene (1969).

These sculptures, cast from actual people, were painted to make the revealed skin look realistic, replete with veins and blemishes. Hanson then clothed the figures with garments from second-hand clothing stores or from the person who modeled for him. Clearly, these works contained strong social comment, and can be seen as modern parallels to the concerns of 19th-century French Realists such as Honoré Daumier and Jean-François Millet, artists Hanson admired.

Few of Hanson's early sculptures would survive because he later destroyed many of them, preferring to be known for his more mature style.

Around 1970, Hanson abandoned gut-wrenching scenes for more subtle, though no less vivid ones. In that year he made the Supermarket Shopper, Hardhat, and Tourists; Woman Eating was completed in 1971. These were also life-sized, clothed, fiberglass figures. Unlike the earlier works, however, these were single or paired figures, and not overtly engaged in violent activity. Instead, his figures often had a listless, bored look, staring into the distance and disengaged from their surroundings.

In 1967, art dealer Ivan Karp attempted to persuade Hanson to move from South Florida to New York City, and the artist moved to Manhattan in 1969, residing on The Bowery (Bleecker Street) across the street from CBGB. However, in 1973, Hanson moved to Davie, Florida, where he would spend the remainder of his life.

While the earlier works tended to be more contained spatially, the later figures had no clearly defined boundaries separating them from the viewer. They quite literally inhabited the viewer's space—with amusing results at times, as in the cases of Reading Man (1977) or Photographer (1978). Hanson sometimes would cast his own children in his work, as in Cheerleader (1988), and Surfer (1987).

In 2018, two of Hanson's works were exhibited at the Met Breuer in the show "Like Life", which NY Times critic Roberta Smith reviewed, stating "[the show] juxtaposes figurative sculptures throughout time. On view was Hanson's hyper-realistic “Housepainter II” (1984), and “Hermes,” attributed to Polykleitos (A.D. first or second century). Mr. Hanson's sculpture of a black man whitewashing a brown wall underscores the curators’ point that ancient marbles were originally brightly colored — and that the whiteness of Classical art is a fiction that has “colored” the Western view of perfection."

Peter Schjeldahl, noted in his March 2018 article for The New Yorker about the show "Like Life", "his (Hanson's) hyperrealistic tableaux, starring a frowsy working-class housewife and a weary housepainter, curiously become ever more affecting as their period looks recede in time."

The Estate of Duane Hanson is represented by Gagosian Gallery.

Exhibitions

Selected solo exhibitions of Hanson's work include 
 Louisiana Museum of Modern Art, Humlebæk, Denmark (1975)  
 Berlin Artist Programme Akademie der Künste (1975)
 Des Moines Art Center, Iowa (1977) 
 Corcoran Gallery of Art, Washington, D.C. (1978) 
 Whitney Museum of American Art, New York (1978)
 Orlando International Airport, Orlando (1986) - The Traveler
 Fort Lauderdale - Hollywood International Airport, Fort Lauderdale (1990) – Vendor with a Walkman
 KunstHausWien, Vienna (1992) 
 Montreal Museum of Fine Arts, Canada (1994, traveled to Modern Art Museum of Fort Worth, Texas) 
 Daimaru Museum of Art, Tokyo (1995, traveled to Genichiro-Inkuma Museum of Contemporary Art, Kagawa; and Kintetsu Museum of Art, Osaka)

Posthumous exhibitions:
 Saatchi Gallery, London (1997)
 "Duane Hanson, A Survey of his Work from the 30s to the 90s," Museum of Art, Fort Lauderdale(1998, traveled to Flint Institute of Arts, Michigan; Whitney Museum of American Art, New York; and Memphis Brooks Museum of Art, Memphis)
 "Duane Hanson: More than Reality, 2001,” Schirn Kunsthalle, Frankfurt (2001, traveled to Padiglione d'Arte Contemporanea, Milan; Kunsthal, Rotterdam; National Galleries of Scotland, Edinburgh; and Kunsthaus Zürich).
 "Duane Hanson" at the Serpentine Galleries, London, UK (2015). Crystal Bridges Museum of American Art, Bentonville, AR (2016)

Collections

The following collections hold sculptures by Duane Hanson:

 Whitney Museum of American Art, New York, New York 
 San Francisco Museum of Modern Art, San Francisco, California
 Corcoran Gallery of Art, Washington, D.C.
 Cranbrook Art Museum, Bloomfield Hills, Michigan
 Flint Institute of Arts, Flint, Michigan  
 Hunter Museum of American Art, Chattanooga, Tennessee 
 Iris & B. Gerald Cantor Center for Visual Arts, Stanford University in Palo Alto, California
 Kresge Art Museum, Michigan State University, East Lansing, Michigan  
 Lowe Art Museum, University of Miami, Coral Gables, Florida 
 Milwaukee Art Museum, Milwaukee, Wisconsin 
 Museum Ludwig, Cologne Germany
 Nelson-Atkins Museum of Art, Kansas City, Missouri  
 Pennsylvania Academy of the Fine Arts, Philadelphia, Pennsylvania  
 Saatchi Gallery, London, England
 St. Louis Art Museum, St. Louis, Missouri
 Scottish National Gallery of Modern Art, Edinburgh, Scotland
 Smithsonian American Art Museum, Washington, D.C.
 Toledo Museum of Art, Toledo, Ohio
 Wadsworth Atheneum, Hartford, Connecticut
 Yale University Art Gallery, New Haven, Connecticut

See also
John De Andrea
Hyperrealism (painting) and sculpture
Ron Mueck
Photorealism
George Segal
Simulacrum

References

1925 births
1996 deaths
People from Alexandria, Minnesota
20th-century American sculptors
20th-century American male artists
University of Washington alumni
Cranbrook Academy of Art alumni
Hyperrealist artists
Modern artists
Luther College (Iowa) alumni
Macalester College alumni
American male sculptors
Sculptors from Minnesota